Dandot Light Railway was one of several branch lines in Pakistan, operated and maintained by Pakistan Railways. The line began at Dandot RS and ended at Chalisa Junction.

History
The Dandot Light Railway was a   narrow gauge railway which opened in 1905 and extended from Dandot railway station to Chalisa Junction railway station. It was built to serve the Khewra Salt Mine.

Closure
The Dandot Light Railway was dismantled in 1996.

Stations
 Dandot RS
 Khewra
 Sodian Gujar
 Chalisa Junction

See also
 Samasata-Amruka Branch Line
 Karachi–Peshawar Railway Line
 Railway lines in Pakistan

References

Closed railway lines in Pakistan
Railway lines opened in 1905
Railway lines closed in 1996
Railway stations on Dandot Light Railway Line
2 ft gauge railways in Pakistan
1905 establishments in India